Freshwater Redoubt, also known as Fort Redoubt (map reference ) is an old Palmerston fort built in Freshwater Bay on the western end of the Isle of Wight. Construction work for the fort began in 1855 and was completed in 1856. It was finally sold in 1928 and has now been converted into a private residence.

Army use 
Freshwater Redoubt is a Palmerston fort, completed in 1856 to defend Freshwater Bay, which was a possible landing beach for enemy troops. The deep, dry ditch protects the landward approaches.

The Caponier building in the ditch served as barrack accommodation for 24 men. With its iron window-shutters and rifle slots the Caponier also provided a means of ditch defence. The original bridge had a section, which could be withdrawn, near the entrance gate, for defence purposes. The main building, visible through the gate, was originally a single storey, flat-roofed barrack comprising 3 Officers’ Rooms, an Officers’ Kitchen, Staff Sergeant's Quarters, and 2 rooms for 5 and 11 men.

The fort was designed with 2 batteries for a total of 7 guns. The Upper Battery, facing the sea, had four gun emplacements and a separate Lower Battery with three gun emplacements covered Freshwater Bay. Early muzzle-loading guns, using gunpowder and firing cannonballs, were replaced over the years by rifled, breech-loading guns firing shells as military technology advanced.

Location 

The fort is on the Western headland of Freshwater Bay at the foot of Tennyson Down. It enjoys outstanding views of Freshwater Bay to the East and the English Channel to the South and West, with the Solent visible to the North across Freshwater and Yarmouth. The view from the top of the drive is of the Isle of Wight coast running along Compton Bay, with Brighstone Down beyond and continues past Atherfield Point, Chale and Blackgang, towards St. Catherine's Point, with St. Boniface Down in the distance. The small tower visible on the rocks off Hanover Point is an artillery range marker built by the Army. The guns would always fire to seaward of this point

Recent history

The fort is known locally as Fort Redoubt. It was sold by the Army in 1928 and is privately owned. The main building was converted into a two-storey private residence in 1936, and further extended in 1976 but not finished. During the 1980s and 1990s it operated as a tea room. The current owners have completed their own accommodation in the main building and carried out landscaping improvements in the grounds to recover the original setting of the property. The bridge over the moat was replaced in 2011 and, like the original bridge, affords a view of the Caponier along the moat.

The restoration of the Caponier was completed in 2020, and is now 2 holiday lets 

Moonfleet cottage in the grounds was originally married quarters accommodation for the master gunner and is now a holiday cottage called Moonfleet  Since 1994, it has been a Grade II Listed Building.

In 2005, Peter White wrote Moonfleet the opera, based on the story of Moonfleet by J. Meade Falkner, while staying at Fort Redoubt.

Caponier Restoration (2014-2020)

The Caponier building in the ditch had originally served as barrack accommodation for 24 men. By 2000 the roof and floors had been removed at some time in the past (possible for sale of the timber) and all that was left was the brick walls. When the ivy that had grown rampantly over the walls was removed, the render to the external brickwork was found to be in good condition, along with the structural brick work.

The Caponier is accessed from the courtyard via a brick tunnel and down 19 steps before arriving at the upper floor of the 2 floor Caponier building - posing practical and logistical challenges for getting materials and furniture in and out. In 2014 renovation of the Caponier building began by stabilising the brick work, and installing a new insulated flat roof and a new first floor. Works continued on and off until 2017 when the period timber sash windows and shutters were installed - making the building weather proof for the first time in over 40 years. In 2018 works began again to convert the weather proof shell into 2 three bedroom holiday lets. During the last phase of the works, a scaffold bridge was built from the North Side of the bridge, across to the North West upper floor window (pictured in gallery). This temporary structure was removed when the works concluded in 2020.

Every effort has been made to retain the authentic history of the Caponier building despite modern fixtures and fittings. The original metal hooks used to hang soldiers hammocks from have been retained throughout; The gun slits (Embrasure) have been retained and glazed keeping the original lines of sight; the original 2 foot thick brick walls have been exposed emphasising the original military purpose of the building.

The Caponier is now 2 comfortably appointed holiday lets arranged over 2 floors (more images available at links)
 "Fort Redoubt - Upper Caponier" - on the first floor
 "Fort Redoubt - Lower Caponier" - on the ground floor

Further Images

References

Publications

External links
 Victorian Forts data sheet
 Moonfleet cottage Holiday Let
 Fort Redoubt - Upper Caponier Holiday Let
 Fort Redoubt - Lower Caponier Holiday Let

Redoubts
Palmerston Forts
Forts on the Isle of Wight
Government buildings completed in 1856
Grade II listed buildings on the Isle of Wight
Grade II listed forts
1856 establishments in England